Kearsney railway station is on the Dover branch of the Chatham Main Line in England, and serves Kearsney and Temple Ewell.

The station and all trains that serve the station are operated by Southeastern.

The booking office in the station building on the country-bound platform is open only for very limited hours on Mondays to Fridays mornings but a Permit To Travel ticket machine (also on the country-bound platform) caters for out-of-hours ticketing.

The station and the line it serves were built by the London, Chatham & Dover Railway as the station for Temple Ewell and the parish of River. The community of Kearsney grew around the Railway Bell Hotel which was on the main Dover to London road. The station had a small goods siding, and a siding for passenger trains. The next stop towards the coast was Dover, and there was also a loop that took the railway directly onto the Kent Coast Line towards , bypassing Dover. In the early days of the railway this meant trains did not always have to make the steep climb out of Dover. In practice the loop was little used for passenger trains, and mainly used by freight. Latterly the line was used by coal trains to Richborough power station.

Services

All services at Kearsney are operated by Southeastern using  EMUs.

The typical off-peak service in trains per hour is:
 1 tph to  via 
 1 tph to 

During the peak hours, the service is increased to 2 tph.

References

External links

Dover District
Railway stations in Kent
DfT Category E stations
Former London, Chatham and Dover Railway stations
Railway stations in Great Britain opened in 1862
Railway stations served by Southeastern
1862 establishments in England